Georges Loustaunau-Lacau (17 April 1894 – 11 February 1955) was a French army officer, anticommunist conspirator, resistant and politician.

Loustaunau-Lacau was born in Pau, Pyrénées-Atlantiques and in 1912 began his studies at the French Army's officer school, the École Spéciale Militaire de Saint-Cyr. He served on the staffs of Maxime Weygand and Hubert Lyautey.

Loustaunau-Lacau replaced Charles de Gaulle on the staff of Marshal Philippe Pétain. An officer with far-right and anticommunist views, he was one of the founders of the Union des Comités d'action défensive, also known as the Corvignolles network, the military branch of La Cagoule. His complicity with that organisation was discovered during the investigations ordered by Minister of the Interior Marx Dormoy, and he was dismissed from the army in 1938 by order of War Minister Édouard Daladier.

He was recalled to active service at the outbreak of the Second World War but was arrested on the orders of Daladier on 22 March 1940 and imprisoned at Obernai. Later in 1940, under Pétain's new Vichy regime, Loustaunau-Lacau was appointed to head the Légion française des combattants (LFC), a veterans' organisation created by Vichy France.

Loustaunau-Lacau used his new post as a cover to recruit agents for a resistance organisation that was later known as the Alliance network. He was replaced as head of LFC by Xavier Vallat and sent to French North Africa, where his former chief, Marshal Weygand, had him arrested in May 1941. Loustaunau-Lacau escaped and returned to France, where he was arrested and later deported to Mauthausen concentration camp.

He survived his imprisonment and after the war entered conventional politics. He was elected to the National Assembly in 1951 to represent Basses-Pyrénées (now Pyrénées-Atlantiques). Loustaunau-Lacau was promoted to the rank of brigadier-general on 3 February 1955 and died in Paris eight days later.

References

1894 births
1955 deaths
People from Pau, Pyrénées-Atlantiques
Politicians from Nouvelle-Aquitaine
Deputies of the 2nd National Assembly of the French Fourth Republic
French military personnel of World War I
French military personnel of World War II
French Resistance members
Mauthausen concentration camp survivors
Order of the Francisque recipients